That is an English language word used for several grammatical purposes. These include use as an adjective, conjunction, pronoun, adverb, and intensifier; it has distance from the speaker, as opposed to words like this. It also took on the role of the modern word what, though this has since changed, and that has recently replaced some usage of the modern which.

Modern usage 
The word that serves several grammatical purposes. Owing to its wide versatility in usage, the writer Joseph Addison named it "that jacksprat" in 1771, and gave this example of a grammatically correct sentence: "That that I say is this: that that that that gentleman has advanced, is not that, that he should have proved." That can be used as a demonstrative pronoun, 
demonstrative adjective, 
conjunction, 
relative pronoun,
relative adverb,
and an intensifier.

That as a demonstrative pronoun refers to a specific object being discussed, such as in "that is a cat"; the word is a distal demonstrative pronoun, as opposed to proximal, because there is distance between the speaker and the object being discussed (as opposed to words such as this, where there is a relative sense of closeness). 
When used as a demonstrative adjective, that describes which specific object is being discussed; for example, in the phrase "that spotted dog is Fido", that specifies which particular dog is Fido among all spotted dogs. 
In its usage as a conjunction, it connects clauses together, such as in "I know that Peter is right". In sentences with several clauses, that is also used as a discriminator to differentiate between subjects of a clause. 
As a relative pronoun, that introduces restrictive clauses, such as in "the different factors that are fundamental and specific to particular features"; in a study of medical science journals in Britain leading up to 2004, it was found that that had been largely replaced by the word which when used in this context, while writing that is increasingly formal—ranging from verse to fiction to nonfiction—finds that usage decreasing as wh- words (interrogatives) relatively increase. 
That is used as a relative adverb, such as in "it doesn't cost that much". When used in this way, that requires inferences be drawn by the listener to determine the meaning of the speaker. 
The word also intensifies elements of a sentence, similar in function to the word so, such as when one says "I was that ill ... I couldn't even stand up." But just as in its use as a relative adverb, that as an intensifier is best understood when the addressee infers meaning from its usage. In the example given, that intensifies and refers to a possible view already held by the addressee (whether the speaker was not seriously ill), even though the speaker does not explicitly confirm or intensify this previously-held belief.

Historical usage 

It originated in the north of England sometime before the 1200s and spread around the country in the thirteenth century; it then rapidly became the dominant demonstrative pronoun. As a pronoun,  was widely used in Old English, though it was later replaced by wh- words. The symbol ꝥ was used as an abbreviation, before it was phased out by the Romantic þt. Similarly, yͭ was a ligature to represent that, as seen in the gravestone of William Shakespeare: "". Among all relative markers in the English language, including who, which, whose, and what, that—through its ancient form of —appears to be the oldest.

In Old English translations of Latin (but only sparsely in original Old English texts), the phrase  is frequently used—typically meaning "only"—but its origins and characteristics are not well-understood. In these texts,  seems to be used pleonastically (redundantly), and it began to be used as an independent adverb. In the context of weather events,  was never used, such as in the example sentence  (translated as "that rains").

Similarly, for several centuries in Old English and early Middle English texts, the phrase  (translated as "among that") persisted. In the hundreds of years of its existence, it was used infrequently, though the usage was stable.

After verbs such as said, and more generally in introducing a dependent clause, contemporary English grammar allows the speaker to either include that or to omit it. This construction—as in "I suspect (that) he is right"—is called the zero form when that is not used. While there has been some analysis of the relative frequency of Old and Middle English usage of the zero form, these studies are of limited value, since they rely on unique text corpora, failing to give a general view of its usage. In the late period of Middle English, the linguist Norihiko Otsu determined, the zero form was generally as popular as the form in which that is included. The zero form was common in documents closely relating to speech, such as sermons, suggesting spoken English often omitted that in these contexts.

Pronunciation 
That has several pronunciations. The weak and strong forms (the two of received pronunciation) of that vary according to their grammatical roles, with one as a demonstrative and the other as an anaphoric (referencing adverb). In this way,  represents a determining pronoun (such as in "what is that?"), while  is a subordinating word (as in "that is as it should be").

See also
 Dependent statement
 Deixis

References

Citations

Works cited

External links
 

English grammar
English words